Dmitriyevka is a rural locality (a selo) in Lenkovsky Selsoviet, Blagoveshchensky District, Altai Krai, Russia. The population was 94 as of 2013. There is 1 street.

Geography 
Dmitriyevka is located 65 km northeast of Blagoveshchenka (the district's administrative centre) by road. Lenki is the nearest rural locality.

References 

Rural localities in Blagoveshchensky District, Altai Krai